The Walking Dead: Season Two is an episodic adventure video game developed by Telltale Games and based on The Walking Dead comic book series. It is the sequel to The Walking Dead, with the episodes released between December 2013 and August 2014. There was a retail collector's disc edition released after the conclusion of the season. The game employs the same narrative structure as the first season, where player choice in one episode will have a permanent impact on future story elements. The player choices recorded in save files from the first season and the additional episode 400 Days carry over into the second season. Clementine, who was the player's main companion during the first season, is the playable character in Season Two.The Walking Dead: Season Two overall received generally positive reviews from critics; with particular praise going to the atmosphere, protagonist, and its sense of tension; however, its lack of hub areas, lack of impactful choices, and certain aspects of its storytelling were criticized. Many felt it was inferior to its predecessor. A third season, titled The Walking Dead: A New Frontier, was episodically released from December 2016 to May 2017.

Gameplay
Similar to the previous season, The Walking Dead: Season Two is a point-and-click adventure game. The player, in control of Clementine, can direct the character around the environment, examine and interact with various scenery elements and collect and use objects to advance the story. The player can also initiate conversations with non-player characters via conversation trees. Certain replies from other characters may offer the player multiple choices to select from, including the option to stay silent, with a limited amount of time to make the selection; if the player does not select an option, the conversation will continue as if they had stayed quiet. Such choices can affect how the other characters will later react to Clementine which can influence later events in the story.  Other scenes are more action-oriented, requiring the player to complete quick time events to prevent Clementine or her allies from getting killed. If the player fails at these events, the game will restart at the start of the scene. Such action scenes may also require the player to make a key decision within a limited time frame, such as which of two characters to save from attacking walkers.

The player's choices and actions will impact story elements in later episodes; for example, a character that the player does not choose to save will not appear in later scenes. Season Two also incorporates the player's choices from the first season and the DLC 400 Days, via the saved game file from these games, to influence the story and events in these episodes.

Synopsis

Setting and charactersThe Walking Dead: Season Two follows on the first game, and coincides with events of the comic, in which a zombie apocalypse has occurred, turning humans that are bitten or die into zombies, or "walkers"; the only way to stop this conversion is to damage the brain. The game is mostly set more than a year following its predecessor. While the game starts in Georgia, the setting moves to more northern locales as the survivors head towards Michigan, believing there is a large survivor camp there.

The second season follows Clementine (Melissa Hutchison), a young girl who has been able to survive the walkers thanks to the help of Lee Everett (Dave Fennoy). At the start of the apocalypse, Lee helps to protect Clementine and offers to help her find her parents who had gone to Savannah; they join several survivors in their journey. When Clementine is captured, a bitten Lee rescues her, but both realize her parents have become walkers. She is forced to choose between shooting him or leaving him to reanimate, before venturing off on her own.

The second season features several new characters, as well as others returning from the first season. Clementine initially accompanies Omid (Owen Thomas) and Christa (Mara Junot), a couple who are the last known survivors of Clementine's previous group. She then encounters a cabin that shelters several survivors: Luke (Scott Porter), a survivalist who quickly befriends Clementine; Luke's friend Nick (Brian Bremer), and his uncle Pete (Brian Sommer), a hunter; doctor Carlos (Kid Beyond), who is protective over his teenage daughter Sarah (Louisa Mackintosh); and Alvin (Dorian Lockett) and his wife Rebecca (Shay Moore), who are expecting a child. The cabin group has fled from William Carver (Michael Madsen), a charismatic yet dangerous dictator who rules a large survivor group in Howe's Hardware. They later encounter another group of survivors, consisting of Kenny (Gavin Hammon), Clementine's friend who was believed to be killed by walkers; Sarita (Julia Farmer), Kenny's new girlfriend; and Kenny's friend, Walter (Kiff VandenHeuvel) and, Matthew (Wylie Herman). Both factions encounter Carver and his men, whose community includes Bonnie (Erin Yvette) and other survivors that were previously introduced in the 400 Days add-on content from the first season; Jane (Christine Lakin), a lone wolf who had lost her sister to walkers; and Mike (Dan White), a cranky yet humorous survivor. The latter part of the season introduces Arvo (Michael Ark), a Russian teenager with a leg brace who speaks in broken English, later shown to be part of a larger group of other Russian survivors.

PlotThis is only a broad overview of the plot, and may differ based on the choices made during both this game and the preceding season and its add-on, 400 Days.

After the events of the first season, Clementine regroups with Omid and Christa, but Omid is killed during a rest stop. Months later, Christa and Clementine are seeking refuge in Wellington, Ohio but are separated by scavengers. After being saved from walkers, Clementine joins a new group consisting of Luke, Pete, his nephew Nick, Alvin, his pregnant wife Rebecca, Carlos, and his daughter Sarah.

After Pete is killed by walkers, Clementine encounters a man named William Carver, the possible father of Rebecca's child, who is hunting down the group. Forced to abandon their cabin, the survivors find a ski lodge occupied by Clementine's old acquaintance Kenny, his girlfriend Sarita, and their friend Walter. Walkers attack the lodge, during which Nick is potentially killed. They are saved by the arrival of an armed group commanded by Carver. Carver executes Walter and possibly Alvin too, depending on Clementine's actions. Regardless, Carver's group captures everyone except Luke. 

Carver takes them to Howe's Hardware, a fortified mall that he tyrannically runs. Luke sneaks in Howe's and warns the others of an oncoming walker horde. The group, joined by two other survivors, Jane and Mike, and one of Carver's minions, Bonnie, devise a plan to escape by drawing the horde to the mall. During the chaos, Alvin (if alive) is killed by one of Carver's men, while Kenny brutally kills Carver in revenge for an earlier injury that had cost Kenny his left eye. The group makes their way through the walker horde by covering themselves in walker guts, but Carlos and Sarita are killed.

Everyone gathers at the nearby ruins of a museum. Clementine and Jane set out to find Sarah, Luke, and Nick (if alive), who were separated amidst the horde. Clementine and Jane's search leads to a trailer park where Nick (if alive) has reanimated and Luke and Sarah are trapped by walkers. With Sarah catatonic due to her father's death, Clementine can either coerce her to leave with them or abandon her to be devoured. As Rebecca goes into labor, the survivors retreat to the museum's observation deck, which collapses and causes Sarah (if saved before) to fall and get killed. Rebecca gives birth to a boy whom Kenny names Alvin Jr., "AJ". Jane leaves the group out of fear of getting attached to Clementine. As the group heads north, they are ambushed by Russian survivors. When Rebecca dies of exhaustion and blood loss and turns, either Clementine or Kenny kills her to protect AJ, which starts a gunfight.

Amidst the gunfight, Jane returns to save the others. Arvo, the sole Russian survivor, is left alive on the promise of supplies. He directs the group to a home across a frozen lake, but the ice breaks and Luke and potentially Bonnie fall through and drown. Kenny brutalizes Arvo, blaming him for Luke's death, which horrifies the others. They find a truck, planning to use it to leave the next morning. However, Clementine catches Arvo, Bonnie (if alive), and Mike attempting to escape from Kenny with the supplies, afraid of his increasing rage. Clementine is shot by Arvo and passes out. She awakens in the truck with Jane, Kenny, and AJ as they are heading north, the others having runoff. The road is blocked amid a blinding blizzard and Kenny leaves to look for gas to siphon. Fed up with Kenny, Jane tries to convince Clementine to abandon him with her, but the two are separated by walkers. Clementine regroups with Kenny, but Jane then arrives without AJ, and it is implied she had to leave him behind. As an enraged Kenny fights and overpowers Jane, Clementine must decide whether to shoot Kenny to save Jane or allow Kenny to kill her.

If Clementine kills Kenny, she then learns that Jane hid AJ and faked his death to manipulate Clementine into believing Kenny was unstable. Thereafter, Clementine can either forgive Jane and return to Howe's with her or refuse and set off alone with AJ. If Clementine instead allows Kenny to kill Jane, she then has the option of either killing or abandoning Kenny and leaving with AJ or forgiving Kenny and staying with him. If they stay together, the two eventually find Wellington, but the community's overpopulation forces Clementine to decide whether to enter with AJ and leave Kenny or stay with him.

Episodes
The game is separated into five episodes, like the first season.

Development
When Telltale Games acquired the right to make video games based on The Walking Dead comics, they signed a contract for a "multi-year, multi-platform, multi-title" license. This license went into effect after the success of the first season of The Walking Dead, when Telltale commissioned a second series of games based on the franchise. The first season was considered highly successful, helping to revitalize the adventure game genre which had been in decline since the mid-1990s, with Telltale being recognized as one of the top development studios in 2012.
 
During an interview on IGN's Up at Noon, writer Gary Whitta teased more The Walking Dead from Telltale sooner than later. "You won't have to wait for season two to play more Walking Dead", he claimed. "I can tell you what you already know, which is season two is coming. There's not much to say because it really is very early... it's a way off", said Whitta. "But, knowing that it's a way off, and knowing that people are hungry for more Walking Dead there may very well be more Walking Dead from Telltale before season two. We may have a little something extra for you between season one and two". Whitta continued to tease that something is in the works right now "that will make the wait for season two slightly less agonizing". This was revealed at the 2013 Electronic Entertainment Expo in June 2013 to be an additional episode called The Walking Dead: 400 Days that is available as downloadable content for the first season. It introduces five new characters that journalists expect to carry into Season Two. 400 Days will use data about the player's decisions in season one, and decisions made in 400 Days will carry into Season Two.

Writing
Writing for Season Two was done to contrast the work they had completed in the first season. At the start of the writing cycle for the second season, they had debated who their primary character would be including introducing new group of survivors that they could use to flesh out the backstories of characters from the first season, or with a new "protector" for Clementine. They eventually agreed to use Clementine as the main character as they felt her story needed to be continued. By changing the player's perspective from that of Lee to Clementine, they wanted to create a "different sort of agency" that the player will experience. Instead of the player, as Lee, looking to help Clementine and others, the player as Clementine would now have to determine who to trust to help her. They also emphasize this new perspective by using several camera angles from a low perspective, to emphasize that Clementine is a child compared to others she meets. The developers also recognized that they needed to avoid making Clementine feel like a "carbon copy" of the character from the first season and instead something crafted by the player's decisions. To resolve this they created the first scenario of the game that would separate her from the familiar characters and to make it feel a result of the player's actions, so that the player would directly connect with Clementine's situation. The concept they kept in mind to write for Season Two was "[Clementine is] eleven years old and the world doesn't care."

Release
As with the previous season, Telltale plans to release Season Two for Microsoft Windows and OS X computers, on PlayStation 3, Xbox 360, PlayStation Vita, and on iOS devices. Releases for the PlayStation 4 and Xbox One consoles were announced in May 2014 with release at a later date, along with retail versions of the game for PlayStation 3 and Xbox 360 consoles. A Nintendo Switch version was released in 2020.

The season was formally announced in late October 2013. The announcement showcased Clementine as the playable character for the game, set sometime after the events of the first series. Telltale's CEO Dan Conners stated that this will put "players in the shoes of a lead role that will challenge their expectations of how to survive in a world where no one can be trusted". The first episode was released in the fourth quarter of 2013, with subsequent episodes released four to six weeks apart.  A collector's disc was announced to purchase at the end of the season, with those who pre-order the game (from the Telltale Games Store) receiving it for just the shipping and handling cost.

Soundtrack
On September 10, 2019, an official soundtrack album of Jared Emerson-Johnson's B.A.F.T.A. Award nominated score to the game was released for digital download and on streaming services, with a special edition set of vinyl lps due to release shortly thereafter.

Spin-off and sequel
Telltale Games and Skybound Entertainment announced spin off mini-series The Walking Dead: Michonne released in February 2016 and third season titled The Walking Dead: A New Frontier was released with first two episodes in December 2016, with physical season pass released February 2017.

Reception

The Walking Dead: Season Two overall received generally positive reviews from critics; with particular praise going to the atmosphere, protagonist, and its sense of tension; however, its lack of hub areas, lack of impactful choices, and certain aspects of its storytelling were criticized.

Episode 1 – All That Remains
Episode 1 – All That Remains received positive reviews. Aggregating review websites GameRankings and Metacritic gave the PlayStation 3 version 81.29% and 82/100, the PC version 78.76% and 78/100 and the Xbox 360 version 77.50% and 80/100. Matt Liebl from GameZone gave the episode an 8.5/10, stating that it "...is just a taste of what's to come -- a mere setup for the horror that awaits us in the final four episodes."

Episode 2 – A House Divided
Episode 2 - A House Divided received positive reviews. Aggregating review websites GameRankings and Metacritic gave the PlayStation 3 version 87.29% and 82/100, the PC version 81.39% and 81/100 and the Xbox 360 version 79.44% and 80/100. Mitch Dyer from IGN gave the episode a 9.5/10, saying it is one of the best episodes Telltale Games has ever made.

Episode 3 – In Harm's Way
Episode 3 - In Harm's Way received positive reviews. Aggregating review websites GameRankings and Metacritic gave the PlayStation 3 version 82.43% and 80/100, the Xbox 360 version 82.25% and 82/100 and the PC version 82.22% and 81/100.

Episode 4 – Amid the Ruins
Episode 4 - Amid the Ruins received mixed to positive reviews. Aggregating review websites GameRankings and Metacritic gave the PlayStation 3 version 79.22% and 78/100, the PC version 78.58% and 78/100 and the Xbox 360 version 72.00% and 71/100. Many critics praised Clementine's development while most criticisms were focused on some of the characters' cheap deaths and sub-par writing compared to the episode's predecessors.

Episode 5 – No Going Back
Episode 5 – No Going Back received positive reviews, higher than its predecessor.  Aggregating review websites GameRankings and Metacritic gave the PlayStation 3 version 81.67% and 87/100, the PC version 79.19% and 78/100 and the Xbox 360 version 77.00% and 84/100. Mitch Dyer of IGN gave the episode a 9.5/10 saying that the finale is "an impressive and intelligent episode, and among Telltale Games' finest stories."

References

External links
 Official website

2013 video games
Android (operating system) games
Episodic video games
Interactive movie video games
IOS games
MacOS games
Nintendo Switch games
Ouya games
PlayStation 3 games
PlayStation 4 games
PlayStation Network games
PlayStation Vita games
Point-and-click adventure games
Telltale Games games
Season Two
Video game sequels
Video games developed in the United States
Video games featuring female protagonists
Video games with cel-shaded animation
Video games scored by Jared Emerson-Johnson
Video games set in Georgia (U.S. state)
Video games set in North Carolina
Video games set in Tennessee
Video games set in Ohio
Video games set in the United States
Video games set in 2005
Video games with alternate endings
Windows games
Xbox 360 games
Xbox 360 Live Arcade games
Xbox Cloud Gaming games
Xbox One games
Video games with commentaries
Video games featuring black protagonists